Nebria storkani is a species of ground beetle in the Nebriinae subfamily that is endemic to Greece.

References

External links
Nebria storkani at Fauna Europaea

storkani
Beetles described in 1939
Beetles of Europe
Endemic fauna of Greece